Rachkovsky or Rachkovski (Russian: Рачковский) is a Russian language surname. The feminine form is Rachkovskaya (Russian: Рачковская). It corresponds to Lithuanian surname Račkauskas and Polish Raczkowski. 

The surname may refer to:

Pyotr Rachkovsky (1853–1910), Russian Empire police official 
Igor Rachkovsky (born 1968), Belarusian statesman, Chief of the State Committee of Border Guards, Belarus 

Russian-language surnames